Builg is the name given to an ancient people who may have lived in southern Ireland, around the modern city of Cork.

According to the historical scheme proposed by T. F. O'Rahilly the Builg are identical with or a sub-group of the Érainn or Iverni, who arrived in Ireland ca 500 BC and are attested in Ptolemy's 2nd century AD Geography. In O'Rahilly's view, they spoke a P-Celtic language known as Ivernic.

Their name may be related to both that of the Belgae of Gaul and Roman Britain, and that of the Fir Bolg of Irish mythology.

See also
Early history of Ireland

References
 T. F. O'Rahilly, Early Irish History and Mythology. Dublin Institute for Advanced Studies. 1946

Ancient Ireland
Ancient peoples